Snowy Road is a 2015 South Korean historical drama film directed by Lee Na-jeong 
which narrates the story of two teenage girls' fate as comfort women during the Japanese occupation of Korea. It originally aired on KBS1 in 2015 as a two-part television special, and then was re-edited for theatrical screening. The theatrical cut was first showcased at the 16th Jeonju International Film Festival.

The film was theatrically released on March 1, 2017, also known as the Independence Movement Day in South Korea, which commemorates the 1919 March 1st Movement.

Cast
 Kim Hyang-gi as Choi Jong-boon (past)
 Kim Sae-ron as Kang Young-ae  
 Kim Young-ok as Choi Jong-boon (present)
 Cho Soo-hyang as Jang Eun-soo
 Jang Young-nam as Choi Jong-boon's mother
 Seo Young-joo as Kang Young-joo  
 Lee Seung-yeon as Yoon Ok
 Jang Dae-woong as Choi Jong-gil
 Lee Joo-woo as Ayako
 Lee Kan-hee as Kang Young-ae's mother 
 Seo Jin-won as Kang Young-ae's school teacher 
 Choi Dae-chul as (cameo)
 Lee Hak-joo as Child soldier

Awards and nominations

References

External links

 
Snowy Road at Naver Movies 

South Korean historical drama films
2015 films
2010s historical drama films
Films set in Korea under Japanese rule
2015 drama films
2010s South Korean films